Palpada vinetorum is a species of syrphid fly in the family Syrphidae. It is a native flower fly species to North America, mainly found in Texas and parts of the east coast.

Description 
 Length 10 to 14mm. 
Head Frontal triangle covered with white pile. The middle frons with a thin brownish stripe and yellow brown pile to the eyes.; Sime blackish pile notednear the ocelli. The  face is reddish-yellow with whitish pollen and pile on the sides. The median stripe (tubercle) and cheeks shining, somewhat brownish.  Antennae reddish-yellow, arista bare. Eyes are  Holoptic in male. The occiput is black above, white pile below.
Thorax  Scutum has three distinct grayish-olivaceous crescent shaped bands over a opaque black base color.,The first grey band is on the front border, the second just before the lateral suture, and the third, the broadest, is just in front of the scutellum,  yellowish; pleurae are yellowish with grayish pollen. The  scutellum is reddish-yellow with a  lighter posterior border and long yellow pile along posterior edge.
Abdomen The first segment is  black, reddish-yellow on the sides. The second segment has  large reddish yellow lateral spots, not quite reaching the hind border, The opaque black in the middle is very narrow,  broader in front, and reaching across the segment in front of the indistinct  yellow-brown hind border. The third segment witb a large reddish- yellow spot  on the sides, usually more reddish, than the second segment and with a narrow yellowish hind border. Across the middle, a shining  baud with an opaque black spot in front and a similar colored band behind;  In the female the yellow spots on the third segment are often smaller or wanting. The fourth segment has a shining cross-band in front, opaque behind and a broadly yellow posterior border.

Wings Wings are hyaline except basal portion a little yellowish and they have a brownish tinge below the stigma.cell. Vein R1 is short petiolate and  vein R4+5 distinctly sinuate. The spurious vein distinct. 
Legs The anterior and middle pairs yellowish or reddish, with the base of femora and tip of tibiae brownish. the hind femora considerably are dilated, usually broadly blackish, sometimes deep red.The  distal half of hind tibiae is blackish.

References

External links

 

Eristalinae
Articles created by Qbugbot
Insects described in 1798
Taxa named by Johan Christian Fabricius
Hoverflies of North America
Diptera of South America